The 1904 Oklahoma Sooners football team represented the University of Oklahoma as an independent during the 1904 college football season. In their only year under head coach Fred Ewing, the Sooners compiled a 4–3–1 record, and outscored their opponents by a combined total of 204 to 96. This was the first season in which the Sooners played Oklahoma A&M in the Bedlam Series. The first meeting of the two rivals, played on November 5, is known as the infamous Ball in the Creek Game

Schedule

References

Oklahoma
Oklahoma Sooners football seasons
Oklahoma Sooners football